"Records" is a song by the American rock band Weezer, released on June 16, 2022, as the first single from the second of their planned 2022 series of four extended plays SZNZ: Summer.

Release
"Records" was released as a single on June 16, 2022. The song features a unique method to listen to it called the "Human Record Player," a smartphone app that will play the song as one physically spins themself around clockwise.

The song made its live debut on Jimmy Kimmel Live! on June 20, 2022.

On August 31, 2022, Weezer released a remix of "Records" featuring the rapper Noga Erez.

Critical reception
Rob Wilson at Gigwise described the song as "catchy but undercooked," and stated that it feels out-of-place on the EP "musically and conceptually."

Charts

References

2022 singles
2022 songs
Songs about music
Songs written by Rivers Cuomo
Weezer songs